The 2016 Volta ao Algarve was a road cycling stage race that took place in the Algarve region of Portugal between 17 and 21 February 2016. It was the 42nd edition of the Volta ao Algarve and was rated as a 2.1 event as part of the UCI Europe Tour.

The race was won by defending champion, 's Geraint Thomas.

The race consisted of five stages. Two of these were summit finishes, while the third was an individual time trial.

Teams 

The race organisers invited 24 teams to start the race. Twelve of these were UCI WorldTeams; four were UCI Professional Continental teams; eight were UCI Continental teams. Each team could include up to eight riders.

Route 

The race includes five stages. The first stage is moderately hilly, with a flat finish. It is followed by a summit finish on the second stage, with the climb of the Alto da Foía, the highest point in the region. The climb has not been used in the Volta ao Algarve since 2002. There is then a flat,  individual time trial on the third stage. Another moderately hilly stage follows on the fourth stage. The fifth and final stage ends with the climb of the Alto do Malhaõ, traditionally the decisive point in the race.

Classifications

References

External links 

 

Volta ao Algarve
Volta ao Algarve
2016